William Davis Garwood, Jr. (April 28, 1884 – December 28, 1950) was an American stage and film actor and director of the early silent film era in the 1910s.

Between 1911 and 1913, Garwood starred in a number of early adaptions of popular films, including Jane Eyre and The Vicar of Wakefield (1910), Lorna Doone (1911), The Pied Piper of Hamelin (1911), David Copperfield (1911), The Merchant of Venice (1912), and Little Dorrit (1913), and Robin Hood (1913). In total, he starred in more than 150 short and feature films.

Early life
William Davis Garwood, Jr. was born in Springfield, Missouri. He attended public schools in Springfield before moving to New Mexico at the age of 15.

Career
Garwood left American Studios after eight months and signed a two-year contract with Universal Film Manufacturing Company in late May 1914. Garwood's first picture for Universal was On Dangerous Ground, released in 1915. By this time, Garwood's popularity had risen and he became a popular leading man with a sizable female fan base. During this time, he worked exclusively with a popular actress of the time, Violet Mersereau, with whom he starred in a number of short films. They worked together in many one-reel comedy film that year, including You Can't Always Tell, Destiny's Trump Card, Uncle's New Blazer, The Adventure of the Yellow Curl Papers, Wild Blood and The Supreme Impulse. During his time at Universal, Garwood also starred as the title character in Lord John in New York (now considered lost). Based on the short story by C.N. and A.M. Williamson, the film proved to be popular with audiences and Garwood starred in four more Lord John films over the following months.

Later years and death
By the late 1910s, Garwood's career began to falter because of his chronic alcoholism. He made his final screen appearance in 1919's A Proxy Husband, which he also directed after which he retired. Garwood reportedly lived off of the fortune he made through various investments.

Garwood was a lifelong bachelor and had no children. On December 28, 1950, he died of cirrhosis due to alcoholism in Los Angeles at the age of 66.

Selected filmography

References

External links

 
 

1884 births
1950 deaths
20th-century American male actors
Alcohol-related deaths in California
American male film actors
American male silent film actors
American male stage actors
Burials in California
Deaths from cirrhosis
Film directors from Missouri
Male actors from Missouri
People from Springfield, Missouri
Silent film directors